Globo Marcas was a Brazilian company of branding and advertising, owned by Grupo Globo.

References

External links 
Globo Marcas

Grupo Globo subsidiaries
Companies based in Rio de Janeiro (city)
Brazilian companies established in 2000
Mass media companies established in 2000